Kris Engskov (born ) is an American executive and former political aide who was President Bill Clinton's body man from 1997 to 2000. He was hired one month before the Clinton-Lewinsky scandal broke and was called to testify before a grand jury on that matter twice despite having taken on his job after most of the events in question already had occurred.

Early life
An Arkansas native from Berryville, Engskov had a childhood encounter with Clinton during a campaign visit to his home town in the 1970s. Engskov graduated from the University of Arkansas at Fayetteville with a B.A. in Public Administration.

Career
Engskov started his career at the White House working for the travel office in 1993 shortly after the White House travel office controversy erupted; his work in keeping travel for White House correspondents flowing smoothly during the transition was praised by a Washington Times reporter, who wrote that Engskov "stood out, clearing travel plan hurdles with his dry humor and confidence," as when he stepped in to convince the Air Force not to block takeoff of a charter flight whose pilot had no money to pay for fuel at Andrews Air Force Base. He then worked as an assistant press secretary for about two years, during which Clinton once made an April Fools' Day announcement of Engskov to replace an injured Mike McCurry:
Still hobbled from his knee surgery, Clinton deadpanned that McCurry had "made a fool of himself" by falling down and hurting his knee. "So until we can bring him back to full health, Chris Engskov is going to do the daily briefing today, and he will be my press secretary during Mike's absence," Clinton said. Engskov, 25, is an Arkansas native who works in the press office. "I thought we ought to have a presidential secretary who doesn't have an accent," Clinton quipped. Engskov became the president's body man in December 1997.

Post-Clinton
In June 2000 he left the White House to work as an analyst at the Madrona Venture Group in Seattle, Washington. In 2003 Engskov joined Starbucks as a director of Public Policy. As of 2009, he also was serving as a member of the King County Task Force on Regional Human Services.

On July 20, 2011 it was announced that Engskov would become the new managing director of Starbucks UK and Ireland starting in September 2011. Of the move, John Culver, president of Starbucks Coffee International, said: "Kris brings a great deal of operational and public affairs experience to the role, and is an ideal candidate to continue the momentum Starbucks has achieved in this region. The addition of Kris to the team is a further sign of our commitment to international markets as a key growth engine for the company." On January 3, 2019, Engskov announced he would be the next president of Aegis Living, a Bellevue, Washington-based assisted living and memory care company, and would assume the role in the spring of 2019.

Other
The character Charlie Young from The West Wing, played by actor Dulé Hill, is based in part on Engskov. Former Clinton press secretary Dee Dee Myers, who served as a consultant to the show, arranged for Hill to meet his real-life counterpart in 1999 when the show was just beginning, though Engskov later joked that unlike Charlie, he would never have dated the president's daughter out of a concern for "job security."

Author Christopher Farnsworth met with Engskov to discuss White House operations while preparing to write the 2010 vampire novel Blood Oath, and thanked Engskov in the acknowledgements to the book.

See also
 Body man

References

External links 
Job-seeking Clinton aides are striking out on their own

Living people
Year of birth missing (living people)
Assistants to the President of the United States
Clinton administration personnel
People from Seattle
People from Berryville, Arkansas